Alessandra Aguilar Morán (born 1 July 1978 in Lugo) is a Spanish long-distance runner who specialises in marathon running. She represented her country in the event at the 2008 Summer Olympics and at the World Championships in Athletics the following year and then at the 2012 Summer Olympics and the World Championships following that.

Before focusing on the marathon, she competed mainly in cross country running competitions. She represented Spain at the IAAF World Cross Country Championships every year from 2000 to 2010, with the sole exception of 2007. Her best finish was twenty-fourth place at the 2009 edition. She won a team gold medal with the Spanish women at the 2007 European Cross Country Championships in Toro, Spain via a seventeenth-place finish. She also won a team bronze medal at the 2009 European Cross Country Championships.

She has a best of 32:26 minutes for the 10K distance, set at the 2007 Great Manchester Run. At the 2008 Granollers Half Marathon she took second place behind Rahab Ndungu, running a personal best time of 1:11:33 for the distance. She made her debut over the full distance at the Rotterdam Marathon that April and set a personal best of 2:29:03 to take third place. She won the Hamburg Marathon title in 2009 with a time of 2:29:01, which was enough to gain her qualification into the 2009 World Championships in Athletics. In the World Championship marathon she managed 25th place overall. She ran at the San Silvestre Vallecana race on New Year's Eve and took fifth place just behind her compatriot Marta Domínguez.

Following a win at the Venta de Baños Cross, Aguilar competed for Spain at the 2010 European Athletics Championships, which was held in Barcelona, and managed seventh in the marathon – the best Spanish finisher in the race. She set her sights on competing at the 2010 European Cross Country Championships in December and established herself as one of Spain's top contenders for the competition with a top five run at the Cross de Atapuerca and a win at the Cross Internacional Valle de Llodio. Her eighth-place finish at the European Championships was the best of the Spanish women and she led the national team to the bronze medals.

She was also selected for the 2011 IAAF World Cross Country Championships, held on home turf in Punta Umbría, but finished outside the top forty while the Spanish women ended up eighth in the team competition. She was in good form at the Rotterdam Marathon the following month and took fourth place and improved her best by two minutes, completing the distance in 2:27:00. She represented Spain in the marathon at the 2011 World Championships in Athletics, but failed to finish the race. Aguilar was suspended by the IAAF for 3 months from February 2012 to May 2012 for an unspecificed doping violation committed at a Cross Country race in Cantimpalos in December 2011.

She qualified for the women's marathon at the 2012 Summer Olympics, finishing in 26th place. She went on to finish 5th at the 2013 World Athletics Championships.

Achievements

References

External links

 
 

1978 births
Living people
Spanish female long-distance runners
Spanish female marathon runners
Athletes (track and field) at the 2008 Summer Olympics
Athletes (track and field) at the 2012 Summer Olympics
Athletes (track and field) at the 2016 Summer Olympics
Olympic athletes of Spain
Sportspeople from Lugo
World Athletics Championships athletes for Spain
Doping cases in athletics
Spanish sportspeople in doping cases